A384 may refer to:

 Autovía A-384, a highway in Andalusia, Spain
 A384 road (England), a road in Devon